The Violin Concerto in E major, BWV 1042, by Johann Sebastian Bach is a concerto based on the three-movement Venetian concerto model, albeit with a few unusual features as each movement has "un-Italian characteristics". It is written for violin, strings, and continuo in the following movements:

While there are two 18th-century scores, neither is autographed; however, Bach re-used the concerto as the model for his Harpsichord Concerto in D major, BWV 1054, found in his 1737–39 autographed manuscript of these works. The concerto is thought to have been written when Bach was working for the court of Köthen or when Bach was in Leipzig.

References

External links
 
 

Concertos by Johann Sebastian Bach
Bach Violin Concerto in E major
Compositions in E major

de:Violinkonzerte (Bach)#Violinkonzert E-Dur BWV 1042